William Whitfield may refer to:

 William Whitfield II (1715–1795), American Revolutionary War officer and planter
 William Whitfield III (1743–1817), American Revolutionary War soldier and slave owner
 William H. Whitfield (1804–1886), American sea captain and member of the Massachusetts House of Representatives
 Sir William Whitfield (architect) (1920–2019), British architect & town planner